Paraclodia besucheti is a species of beetle in the family Cerambycidae, and the only species in the genus Paraclodia. It was described by Breuning in 1974.

References

Acanthocinini
Beetles described in 1974
Monotypic beetle genera